Pratitnagar is a census town in Dehradun district in the Indian state of Uttarakhand.

Geography

Demographics
 India census, Pratitnagar had a population of 7078. Males constitute 50% of the population and females 50%. Pratitnagar has an average literacy rate of 70%, higher than the national average of 59.5%: male literacy is 77%, and female literacy is 64%. In Pratitnagar, 13% of the population is under 6 years of age.

References

Cities and towns in Dehradun district